Georg Leo Graf von Caprivi de Caprara de Montecuccoli (English: Count George Leo of Caprivi, Caprara, and Montecuccoli; born Georg Leo von Caprivi; 24 February 1831 – 6 February 1899) was a German general and statesman who served as the chancellor of the German Empire from March 1890 to October 1894. Caprivi promoted industrial and commercial development, and concluded numerous bilateral treaties for reduction of tariff barriers. However, this movement toward free trade angered the conservative agrarian interests, especially the Junkers. He promised educational reforms to the Catholic Center party which would increase their influence, but failed to deliver. As part of Kaiser Wilhelm's "new course" in foreign policy, Caprivi abandoned Bismarck's military, economic, and ideological cooperation with the Russian Empire, which historians consider a major mistake. Even worse, Caprivi misjudged multiple opportunities to open good relations with the United Kingdom of Great Britain and Ireland. Frustrated, Britain turned to the Empire of Japan and the French Third Republic for agreements. Caprivi's downfall came with trade agreements that favored German industry and urban workers over more powerful agricultural interests. Historians praise his refusal to renew the harsh restrictions on socialists, and his success in the reorganization of the German military.

Biography

Family background
Leo von Caprivi was born in Charlottenburg (then a town in the Prussian Province of Brandenburg, today a district of Berlin), the son of jurist Julius Leopold von Caprivi (17971865), who later became a judge at the Prussian supreme court and member of the Prussian House of Lords. His father's family was of Italian origin (Caprara Montecuccoli, from Modena), and possibly also Slovenian.  It has been claimed that their original surname was Kopriva and they originated from Koprivnik (Nesseltal) near Kočevje in the Kočevje Rog (Hornwald) region of Lower Carniola (present-day Slovenia). However, other research states that this cannot be confirmed. The Caprivis were ennobled during the 17th century Ottoman–Habsburg wars.  They later moved to Landau in Silesia. His mother was Emilie Köpke, daughter of Gustav Köpke, headmaster of the Berlinisches Gymnasium zum Grauen Kloster and teacher of Caprivi's predecessor Otto von Bismarck.

On a personal level, Leo von Caprivi was an affable man with few close friends. He never married.

Military career 
Caprivi was educated in Berlin. He entered the Prussian Army in 1849 and served in the Second Schleswig War of 1864, the Austro-Prussian War of 1866 as a major in the staff of Prince Friedrich Karl of Prussia, and the Franco-Prussian War of 1870/71, the latter as chief of staff of the X Army Corps. Backed by the Chief of the general staff Helmuth von Moltke, Caprivi achieved the rank of lieutenant colonel and distinguished himself at the Battle of Mars-la-Tour, the Siege of Metz and the Battle of Beaune-la-Rolande, receiving the military order Pour le Mérite.

After the war he served at the Prussian War Ministry. In 1882, he became commander of the 30th Infantry Division at Metz. In 1883, he succeeded Albrecht von Stosch, a fierce opponent of Chancellor Bismarck, as Chief of the Imperial Navy. The appointment was made by Bismarck and caused great dissatisfaction among the officers of the navy. According to historian Robert K. Massie, at the time of Caprivi's appointment, he "had no interest in naval affairs and did not know the names of his officers or the emblems of rank on the uniforms they wore." However, Caprivi showed significant administrative talent in the position.

Caprivi emphasized the development and construction of torpedo boats during his tenure as naval chief. This eventually led him into conflict with Emperor Wilhelm II, who favored larger battleships on the English model. After being overruled on the issue by the Kaiser, Caprivi resigned in 1888. He was briefly appointed to the command of his old army corps, the X Army Corps stationed in Hanover, before being summoned to Berlin by Emperor Wilhelm II in February 1890.

In Berlin, Caprivi was informed that he was the Kaiser's intended choice if Bismarck was resistant to Wilhelm's proposed changes to the government, and upon Bismarck's dismissal on 18 March, Caprivi became Chancellor. Though his exact motives are unknown, Wilhelm appears to have viewed Caprivi as a moderate who would make a sufficiently strong replacement for Bismarck, should the former chancellor make trouble in retirement, yet lacked the ambition to seriously oppose the throne. For his part, Caprivi was unenthusiastic, yet felt duty-bound to obey the Emperor. He said to one gathering, "I know that I shall be covered in mud, that I shall fall ingloriously".

Chancellor of Germany

Foreign Policy

Caprivi's administration was marked by what is known to historians as the Neuer Kurs ("New Course") in both foreign and domestic policy, with moves towards conciliation of the Social Democrats on the domestic front, and towards a pro-British foreign policy. Success was exemplified by the Anglo-German Agreement of July 1890, in which the British ceded the small island of Heligoland to Germany in exchange for control of Zanzibar and a large portion of East Africa.. This led to animosity from the colonialist pressure-groups like the Alldeutscher Verband. The treaty also gave Germany the Caprivi Strip (named after him), which was added to German South West Africa, thus linking that territory with the Zambezi River, which he had hoped to use for trade and communications with eastern Africa (the river proved to be unnavigable). In general, Caprivi did not believe that Germany should compete with other powers for overseas colonies but rather should focus on its position within Europe. In which the British wanted closer relations and Caprivi's government failed to make an agreement

Ending Reinsurance Treaty
Only a week into office, Caprivi was forced to choose whether to renew the Reinsurance Treaty, a secret alliance Bismarck had made with Russia. Caprivi opposed the ideas of a preventive war against Russia developed by General Alfred von Waldersee. Nevertheless, he conformed to the decision of officials of the Foreign Office around Friedrich von Holstein not to renew the Reinsurance Treaty and focus on a more straightforward alliance with Austria-Hungary. Unaware of the Foreign Office's determination, Wilhelm II had personally assured Russian Ambassador Count Pavel Andreyevich Shuvalov that the treaty would be renewed. When Caprivi discussed the issue with the Emperor, Wilhelm II yielded to his Chancellor, unwilling to dismiss another chancellor one week after dismissing Bismarck. The treaty was not renewed, and Shuvalov was shocked at the sudden reversal. In the years following this rejection, Russia forged the Alliance with France.

Trade policy
According to Andrew Carlson, Caprivi obtained commercial treaties with Austria, Italy, Switzerland, Spain, Serbia, Romania, Belgium, and Russia. The treaties reduced agricultural tariffs, which lowered the price of food in Germany. They also assisted the expansion of German trade exports of industrial products. Opponents were angry at the downplaying of German agriculture in favor of urban workers.  Led by East Elbian Junkers, a coalition emerged that included peasant farmers, artisans, and conservative intellectuals hostile to the emerging industrial society. They demanded the Kaiser remove Caprivi. According to James C Hunt, the Agrarian League was launched in 1893 to protest the reduction in tariffs against imported grains. The league was organized nationally like a political party, with local chapters, centralized discipline, and a clear-cut platform. It fought against free trade, industrialization, and liberalism. Its most hated enemy was socialism, which it blamed on Jewish financial capitalism. The League helped establish grassroots anti-Semitism of the sort that flourished into the 1930s.

Domestic reforms
A number of progressive reforms were carried out during Caprivi's time as Chancellor. The employment of children under the age of 13 was forbidden and 13- to 18-year-olds restricted to a maximum 10-hour day, in 1891 Sunday working was forbidden and a guaranteed minimum wage introduced, and working hours for women were reduced to a maximum of 11. Industrial tribunals were established in 1890 to arbitrate in industrial disputes, and Caprivi invited representatives of trade unions to sit on these tribunals. In addition, duties on imported timber, cattle, rye, and wheat were lowered and a finance bill introduced progressive income tax under which the more one earned, the more tax that person paid. Other achievements included the army bills of 1892 and 1893, and the commercial treaty with Russia in 1894.

Clash with the Kaiser
Caprivi clashed with Wilhelm increasingly during his term as Chancellor, offering his resignation nearly a dozen times in four years. The Kaiser privately called him "a sensitive old fathead". The anger of the Conservatives intensified, accompanied by constant public attacks by retired Bismarck. Caprivi also lost the support of the National Liberals and Progressives in a legislative defeat of 1892 on an educational bill providing denominational board schools, a failed attempt to re-integrate the Catholic Centre Party after the Kulturkampf. Caprivi, although himself a Protestant, needed the 100 votes of the Catholic Centre Party but that alarmed the Protestant politicians.  Caprivi had to resign as Prussian Minister President and was replaced by Count Botho zu Eulenburg, leading to an untenable division of powers between the Chancellor and the Prussian premier. When the two clashed over revisions to the criminal code in 1894, Wilhelm II required both to resign. They were succeeded by Prince Chlodwig von Hohenlohe-Schillingsfürst.

Following his resignation, Caprivi destroyed his papers. In retirement, he refused to speak or write publicly about his experiences as Chancellor or share his opinions on current events. He died in 1899 in Skyren in Germany (today known as Skórzyn, Poland).

Honours
He received the following orders and decorations:

Notes and references

Further reading
 
 Carlson, Andrew R. German Foreign Policy, 1890-1914, and Colonial Policy to 1914: A Handbook and Annotated Bibliography (Scarecrow Press, 1970) pp 94–103.
 Carroll, E. Malcolm. Germany and the Great Powers, 1866–1914; A Study in Public Opinion and Foreign Policy (1938). 
 
 Lebovics, Herman. "'Agrarians' Versus 'Industrializers': Social Conservative Resistance to Industrialism and Capitalism in Late Nineteenth Century Germany." International Review of Social History 12.1 (1967): 31-65 online.
 Nichols, J. Alden. Germany after Bismarck: The Caprivi Era, 1890-1894 (1958) Online; the main scholarly book

 
 Sempell, Charlotte. "The Constitutional and Political Problems of the Second Chancellor, Leo Von Caprivi," Journal of Modern History, (September 1953) 25#3 pp 234–254, in JSTOR
 Tirrell, Sarah Rebecca. "The Fall of Caprivi." in German Agrarian Politics After Bismarck’s Fall the Formation of the Farmers’ League (Columbia University Press, 1951) pp. 299–334. oenline

 Die Reden des Grafen von Caprivi im deutschen Reichstage, preussischen Landtage und besondern Anlässen "The Speeches of Count von Caprivi in the German Reichstag, in the Prussian Landtag, and on special occasions" in German (Google Books)

1831 births
1899 deaths
19th-century Chancellors of Germany
Politicians from Berlin
Chancellors of Germany
Counts of Germany
German Empire politicians
German military personnel of the Franco-Prussian War
German people of Italian descent
German people of Slovenian descent
German Protestants
Vice admirals of the Imperial German Navy
Independent politicians in Germany
People from the Province of Brandenburg
Generals of Infantry (Prussia)
Prussian politicians
Zambezi Region
Foreign ministers of Prussia
Recipients of the Pour le Mérite (military class)
Recipients of the Iron Cross (1870), 1st class
Recipients of the Iron Cross (1870), 2nd class
Grand Crosses of the Military Merit Order (Bavaria)
Recipients of the Order of the Netherlands Lion
Grand Crosses of the Order of Saint Stephen of Hungary
Grand Cordons of the Order of the Rising Sun
Recipients of the Order of the Medjidie, 1st class
Grand Crosses of the Order of the Star of Romania
Recipients of the Order of St. Anna, 2nd class
Military personnel from Berlin